The 2013–14 Polish Cup was the 57th edition of the Polish Volleyball Cup tournament.

ZAKSA Kędzierzyn-Koźle won their 5th trophy after beating Jastrzębski Węgiel in the final (3–1).

Final four
 Venue: Hala CRS, Zielona Góra
 All times are Central European Time (UTC+01:00).

Semifinals
|}

Final

|}

Final standings

Awards

Most Valuable Player	
  Paweł Zagumny (ZAKSA Kędzierzyn-Koźle)
Best Server
  Dick Kooy (ZAKSA Kędzierzyn-Koźle)
Best Receiver	
  Michał Ruciak (ZAKSA Kędzierzyn-Koźle)
Best Defender
  Damian Wojtaszek (Jastrzębski Węgiel)
	
Best Blocker	
  Łukasz Wiśniewski (ZAKSA Kędzierzyn-Koźle)
Best Opposite Spiker
  Michał Kubiak (Jastrzębski Węgiel)
Best Setter
  Michal Masný (Jastrzębski Węgiel)

See also
 2013–14 PlusLiga

References

External links
 Official website

Polish Cup
Polish Cup
Polish Cup
Polish Cup